The 1944 Yale Bulldogs football team represented Yale University in the 1944 college football season.  The Bulldogs were led by third-year head coach Howard Odell, played their home games at the Yale Bowl and finished the season with a 7–0–1 record.

Schedule

References

Yale
Yale Bulldogs football seasons
College football undefeated seasons
Yale Bulldogs football